Mamadou Sylla Diallo (born 20 March 1994) is a Senegalese professional footballer who plays as a forward for Spanish club Deportivo Alavés.

Career
Born in Kédougou, Sylla moved to Spain in 2004, aged ten, and joined FC Barcelona's youth setup in 2009. He subsequently represented CE Mataró and RCD Espanyol, and made his senior debuts with the latter's reserve team in 2013, in Segunda División B.

On 27 March 2015 Sylla joined Segunda División strugglers Racing de Santander on loan until the end of the campaign, as a short-term replacement to injured Mamadou Koné. He played his first match as a professional on 5 April, starting in a 2–0 home loss against UE Llagostera.

Six days later Sylla scoring his first professional goal, netting a last-minute winner in a 3–2 away win against RCD Mallorca. He returned to the Pericos in June, scoring three goals in 11 appearances but suffering team relegation.

Sylla made his debut in the main category of Spanish football on 27 September 2015, coming on as a second-half substitute for Víctor Sánchez in a 0–3 away loss against Deportivo de La Coruña. On 3 December, he scored his first goal for the team, coming off the bench to open a 1–1 draw at Levante UD in the first leg of the last 16 of the season's Copa del Rey.

On 11 July 2016, Sylla was loaned to Belgian club KAS Eupen for one year. He subsequently joined KAA Gent permanently, but served loan stints at SV Zulte-Waregem and Sint-Truidense VV.

On 5 January 2020, Sylla signed with Russian Premier League side FC Orenburg on loan until the end of the 2019–20 season. On 9 October, he returned to Spain after joining second division side Girona FC on a free transfer, signing a two-year contract.

On 20 August 2021, Sylla agreed to a three-year deal with La Liga side Deportivo Alavés. The following 31 January, he moved to fellow league team Rayo Vallecano on loan for the remainder of the season.

References

External links

Espanyol official profile 

1994 births
Living people
People from Kédougou
Senegalese footballers
Spanish footballers
Association football forwards
La Liga players
Segunda División players
Segunda División B players
Belgian Pro League players
Russian Premier League players
RCD Espanyol footballers
RCD Espanyol B footballers
Racing de Santander players
K.A.A. Gent players
K.A.S. Eupen players
S.V. Zulte Waregem players
Sint-Truidense V.V. players
FC Orenburg players
Girona FC players
Deportivo Alavés players
Rayo Vallecano players
Senegalese expatriate footballers
Expatriate footballers in Belgium
Expatriate footballers in Russia
Senegalese expatriate sportspeople in Belgium
Senegalese expatriate sportspeople in Russia
Senegalese emigrants to Spain